Elizabeth P. Lovelett (born 1980) is an American politician of the Democratic Party. She is a member of the Washington State Senate, District 40.

Lovelett was a member of the city council of Anacortes, Washington, representing At-Large Position 6. She was first elected to city council in 2013, defeating incumbent Bill Turner, and was re-elected without opposition in 2017. On February 5, 2019, Lovelett was appointed to the Washington State Senate following the resignation of Kevin Ranker. She was married to Jensen C. Lovelett in 2002. Prior to entering politics, Lovelett and her husband operated the historical The Business record store in Anacortes.

References

1980 births
Living people
Democratic Party Washington (state) state senators
21st-century American politicians
People from Anacortes, Washington
Women state legislators in Washington (state)
21st-century American women politicians